The Hong Kong Humanity Award is co-organized by the Hong Kong Red Cross and Radio Television Hong Kong. It is the first of its kind in Hong Kong aims to give tribute to those live up to and put into practice the spirit of humanity.

The awardees have outstanding achievement in humanitarian contribution by their voluntary act through different means, such as protecting human life, caring for the health of the vulnerable, and respecting human dignity, etc. in advancing the well-being of people in need regardless of their gender, culture, social status and background. Through the recognition of the awardees' selfless spirit and compassionate behaviour, the co-organizers sincerely hope that more people will learn about the universal value of humanity and the aspirations to equality, mutual help and peace among our community will be further enhanced.

Eligibility of candidate
 Must be a Hong Kong resident, irrespective of age, gender, race and nationality.
 Must show humanitarian contribution through protecting human life, caring for the health of the vulnerable and respecting human dignity. Act should be committed one year prior to nomination.
 Substantial acts or valiant efforts to prevent and/or alleviate human suffering and vulnerability.
 The behavior must be voluntary.
 Candidate should be modeling and spreading the spirit of humanity.

List of awardee 
(in alphabetical order)

2022 
 Dr Chan Cheong-wai
 Mr Aimé Girimana
 Dr Jimmy Leung Hei-jim
 Ms Leung Shun-wah
 Ms Carol Tse Ka-yee

Hong Kong Humanity Youth Power
 Mr Chan Yik-yeung
 Mr Kayson Chau Hung-yeung

2021 
 Dr Shannon Melissa Chan
 Dr Kevin Hung Kei-ching
 Ms Winsome Lee Hin-shin
 Mr Leung Kwok-shing
 Dr Tse Mei-yee
 Dr Jason Yam Cheuk-sing

Hong Kong Humanity Youth Power
 Mr Ho Wai-kit 
 Mr Michael Chan Wai-man

2020 
 Sr Ho Kwai-ping Agnes
 Mr Ng Kwai-lun Pasu
 Dr Patrick Ip
 Ms Shalini Mahtani
 Dr Tong Wing-sze Jennifer
 Prof George Woo

Hong Kong Humanity Youth Power
 Mr Cheung Pak-shun Dennis

2019
 Rev. Dominic Chan Chi-ming
 Ms Tiffany Chan Wai-fun
 Dr John Ngan Hin-kay
 Ms Rabi Yim Chor-pik
 Ms Patty Sy Ching-pik

Hong Kong Humanity Youth Power
 Ms Sylvia Tsang Nga-sze

2018
 Dr Clare Cheng Yuk-kwan
 Dr Ko Chi-cheong
 Dr Michael To Kai-tsun
 Ms Tso Yee-man
 Ms Joyce Tsui Yuk-ying

Hong Kong Humanity Youth Power
 Mr Raymond Yu Kam-wing

2017
 Dr Chow Sik-kuen
 Dr Law Sheung-wai
 Mr Walter Leung Wai-yin
 Mr Howard Ling Ho-wan
 Mr Robert Wong Kin-ming
 Mr Chris Yeung Wai-kei & Mrs Lydia Yeung Mak Yin-fung

Hong Kong Humanity Youth Power
 Ms Michelle Siu Hoi-yan: a visually impaired musician

2016
 Mr Chan Hon-man: Founder and head of "Repair Fairy"
 Dr Kwong Wing-yan: doctor
 Mr Lam Kar-yeung: professional in Chinese medicine
 Mr Ng Yiu-fai: Founder of "You Will Succeed", an online job hunting platform for disabilities 
 Mr Pau Chun-yu: Nurse
 Mr Yip Bing-chiu: As a visually impaired, he develops mobile apps for helping people with similar disabilities in order to direct, access social facilities and get traffic information

2015
 Dr Chan Ngai-yin: Specialist in cardiology
 Dr Chiu Hon-ching: Dentist
 Ms Lam Kam-ching: voluntarily visit and concern the prisoners for years
 Ms Jenny Law Chun-heung: As one working in the industry of beauty salon, she has built a volunteer group which provide free haircut for elders in the Southern District
 Dr Eric Leung Siu-fai: Dentist
 Mrs Bessie S M Pang: provide help for children with hearing loss
Hong Kong Humanity Youth Power
 Mr Clovis Man Kwok-pan

2014
 Mrs Chan Leung Yuet-ming, Grace: with an aspiration of a more inclusive society, has served for the visually impaired; former Chief Executive of The Hong Kong Society for the Blind
 Ir Ho Ngai-leung, Albert: Geotechnical engineer, has applied his expertise in school reconstruction work after 2008 Sichuan Earthquake and on-site needs assessments for Sowers Action
 Dr Li Yuen-mei, Emmy: Ophthalmologist, active in volunteering ophthalmic services and promoting public awareness on eye care 
 Mr Sin Wing-sang Edward: Retired actuary, volunteered to tutor people in need, including visually/hearing impaired students, orphans, youths with emotional or behavioral problems, new arrivals from Mainland China and ethnic minorities; also taught prison inmates local language and computer
 Mr WONG Ka-ning, Raymond and Mrs WONG HO Shuk-ying, Viola: Stimulated by their only son with speech communications difficulty, they have founded of the Benji's Centre — the first and only charity in Hong Kong providing speech therapy to children aged below 16 from low-income families; set up social enterprise and put earnings into the Benji's Centre

2013
 Dr Chu Chor-lup: One of the founder of the "A.J.R. Charitable Foundation Limited", which assist financially for those in distress and needing timely support
 Dr Lau Wai-sum, Eilly: dentist, has organized various voluntary dental service for elderly people and needy groups in Hong Kong and the mainland
 Mr Mak Yiu-yeung, Sunny: Set up a self-financed charity "Sunshine Action" to visit people living below the poverty line
 Professor TANG Wai-lan, Gladys: Researcher in deaf children education, especially in the area of sign language
 Dr Wong Chung-kwong: Former Professor of the Department of Psychiatry of The Chinese University of Hong Kong, has devoted to promote education in mental health

2012
 Mr Ko Chi-kin, Derek: Has actively provided outdoor adventure activities for people of all ages, especially those for disabilities
 Mr Lau Tat-keung, Gregory: Police superintendent, with the secondary duty as a negotiator, has persuade more than 200 people out of suicidal thoughts and volunteered to send out suicide prevention messages
 Dr Leung Tze-ching, Vincent: Doctor with extensive experience in neonatal care, has served for newborn resuscitation in rural China
 Rev Thomas Anthony Peyton: Missionary of Maryknoll Fathers and Brothers, actively visited and cared for minority groups such as prison inmates, mental disabilities and needy residents in old districts
 Ms Wong Wai-fun, Fermi: Founder of the Hong Kong Unison, serving ethnic minorities

2011
 Ms Lai Wing-kun, Joyce: Volunteer nurse
 Mr Law Wai-cheung, Willy: Chairman of Direction Association for the Handicapped
 Dr Pang Chi-wang, Peter: Regularly goes to undeveloped areas to operate on people to close their clefts, and actively promote health education
 Ms So Kam-mui: Paralyzed from the waist down an accident when she was 15 years old, has devoted herself into volunteering and encouraged others through her own experience for almost 38 years
 Mr Wong Chi-hung, Percy: Social work, has served minorities group in the Mainland and also helped raising the standards of China's social workers
 Ms Yiu Mui-fan, Esther: Volunteer nurse

2010
 Father Sean Patrick Burke: Volunteering for disadvantaged people in Hong Kong for years
 Dr Chung Wai-ling, Margaret: Founder of "Regeneration Society" in 1991, also serve in many public committees related to health care and rehabilitation
 Dr Albert Ko: Mechanical engineer and active international humanitarian service volunteer
 Professor Edward Ng: Using his professional knowledge in architecture to serve rural area in mainland; had launched a project called “A Bridge Too Far, A Dream Comes True” in Gansu
 Dr Poon Tak-lun: Active participant in emergency relief work and First Aid Training

2009
 Dr Au Yiu-kai: Active outreach volunteer doctor
 Mr. Chan Kam-yuen: Active volunteer in disability issues, had helped Hong Kong Association of the Deaf to overcome a governance crisis
 Dr Fan Ning: Doctor, active in medical humanitarian missions, repeatedly joined the Hong Kong Red Cross relief operation around the world
 Sister Helen Marie Kenny: Pioneer of the hospice movement in Hong Kong
 Mr. Leung Kin-wah: Sowers Action volunteer, had launched "The Long March for Education" fund-raising walk in 2002
 Professor Leung Ping-chung: Professor Emeritus of Orthopaedics and Traumatology of The Chinese University of Hong Kong, repeatedly visited poverty-stricken regions
 Mrs Priscilla Lui Tsang Sun-kai: Director of Against Child Abuse
 Professor Martin Wong Chi-sang: Professor in Department of Community and Family Medicine and the School of Public Health in CUHK, has been Founding President of the Hong Kong Healthcare Professional Seminar Association, Chairman of the Organising Committee for‘ Ten Outstanding Warriors of Regeneration, active in other community services
 Dr Wu Kit-ying Kitty: Clinical psychologist, had provided service after 2008 Sichuan earthquake

2007
 Mr David James Begbie: director of the Global Village Life X-perience programme, a spokesman for both Crossroads International and Global Hand
 Prof Chan Ying-yang, Emily: activist in medical humanitarian relief, had been the President of Medecins Sans Frontieres in Hong Kong
 Dr Chow Pak-chin: Ophthalmic doctor, one of the founders of "Project Vision"
 Prof Lam Shun-chiu, Dennis: Ophthalmologist, founder of Action for Vision Eye Foundation
 Mr So Wai-sang: Registered nurse (psychiatric), formed a drama club to promote life education 
 Mr To Chung: One of the founders of Chi Heng Foundation which promote education of AIDS and related topics

References

External links
 Official website of Hong Kong Humanity Award (hosted by Hong Kong Red Cross)

Humanitarian and service awards
Hong Kong awards